Gregory Vaughan Taylor (born 15 January 1990) is an English professional footballer who plays for  club Cambridge United. He is a central defender who has played at left back for some of his career. He has also played in central midfield.

Club career
Taylor was born in Bedford, Bedfordshire.

He made his first team debut for Northampton Town, coming on as a substitute in the 90th minute, away to Premier League team Bolton Wanderers, in the 2–1 win in the League Cup on 26 August 2008. That was his only first-team appearance before Mark Cooper signed him for Conference Premier club Kettering Town before the 2009–10 season. In January 2011 he rejoined Cooper at fellow Conference club Darlington, where he signed an 18-month contract.

Darlington had a poor start in the 2011/12 season which led to the chairman Raj Singh offering reduced terms to some of the playing squad whilst others were sold to balance the books.

In November 2011, Taylor signed on loan at fellow Conference side Luton Town until January 2012, with the deal then becoming permanent. On signing for Luton Town manager Gary Brabin said of Taylor "he's a young lad who is ready for us now. He's got a real energy and that ability to get up and down the pitch." He played in 18 games for Luton during the 2011–12 season, scoring once in a 5–0 victory over his former club Kettering Town.

The following season  he went on loan to Conference club Tamworth on 27 September 2012, where he played 10 games over the course of two months. He was involved in Luton's FA Cup campaign to the Fifth Round in early 2013, playing at left-back in 1–0 wins over Wolverhampton Wanderers and Premier League side Norwich City, and also in the 3–0 defeat to Millwall that brought the run to an end. Buckle left the club two weeks later to be replaced by John Still, who reinstated Taylor back to the first-team. However, Taylor chose to leave and sign on loan at promotion-chasing Conference club Mansfield Town on 28 March 2013. Taylor played in Mansfield's final eight games of the season as they won six of them to achieve promotion to The Football League. He was not offered a new contract at Luton and was released by the club at the end of the season.

On 20 June 2013, Taylor signed a two-year contract with Cambridge United until the end of the 2014–15 season.

During the 2013/2014 season Greg Taylor won both the FA Trophy and promotion to the Football League with Cambridge United. He was an integral part of the U's squad to do the double and was ever-present at left back. He signed a contract extension until the 2016/2017 season with the U's in January 2015.

Taylor also started in both FA Cup games against Manchester United. The first game saw Manchester United make the trip to the abbey stadium which ended in 0–0, earning Cambridge a replay at Old Trafford in the 2015/16 season where they lost 3-0.

Taylor extended his deal with Cambridge united in 2018, which would take him to the end of the 2019/20 season  https://www.cambridge-united.co.uk/news/2018/april/greg-taylor-contract-extension/. In 2019 he was made the club captain.

In January 2019, Greg hit a milestone of 250 appearances in Cambridge united's amber and black

on 9 July 2020, Taylor signed a new 1 year contract extension with the U's.

On 17 August 2021, Taylor suffered an ankle injury vs. Plymouth Argyle. In September 2021, Taylor underwent surgery on the ankle and was ruled out for the remainder of the 2021-22 season.

On 5 May 2022, Taylor signed a further 1-year contract with the East Anglian club.

International career
In September 2010, Taylor made his debut for England C against the Wales under-23 selection.

Career Statistics

Club

Honours
2012–13: Conference Premier champions – Mansfield Town
2013–14: Conference Premier play-off winner – Cambridge United
2013–14: FA Trophy winners – Cambridge United

References

External links

 – appearances at Tamworth in 2012–13 season categorised on Soccerbase under the name Rico Taylor.

1990 births
Living people
Sportspeople from Bedford
English footballers
England semi-pro international footballers
Association football defenders
Northampton Town F.C. players
Kettering Town F.C. players
Darlington F.C. players
Luton Town F.C. players
Tamworth F.C. players
Mansfield Town F.C. players
Cambridge United F.C. players
National League (English football) players
People educated at Mark Rutherford School
Footballers from Bedfordshire